Mi Sei Apparso Come Un Fantasma (English: You Came to Me as a Ghost) is a live album by Songs: Ohia. It was recorded at Barchessone Vecchio in Modena, Italy on September 27, 2000. The album received mixed reviews, with a Metacritic score of 60.  While Pitchfork Media wrote that the album "...offers a better introduction to Songs: Ohia than the last couple of proper albums, which seemed like transitional or exploratory releases", The Wires reviewer was underwhelmed, feeling that the disc "[s]till sounds like the work of someone desperate to gain the approval of the Drag City clique".

Track listing 
All songs written by Jason Molina.
 untitled (Are We Getting Any Closer?)
 untitled (Nobody Tries That Hard Anymore)
 "Tigress"
 "Being in Love"
 untitled (Constant Change)
 untitled (It Won’t Be Easy)
 untitled (She Came to Me as a Ghost)
 "Cabwaylingo"

 Bracketed titles for untitled songs taken from the Magnolia Electric Co. website.

Recording information 
 Jason Molina - guitar, vocals
 Dan Sullivan - guitar
 Dan MacAdam - bass
 Jeff Panall - drums

References

External links 
 Mi Sei Apparso Come Un Fantasma page on www.magnoliaelectricco.com

Jason Molina albums
2000 live albums